Durfort is the name of a French noble family, distinguished in French and English history. It originated as feudal lords of Durfort, Tarn, a village of south-western France.

Middle Ages 

Though earlier lords are known, the pedigree of the family is only clearly traceable to

 Arnaud de Durfort (fl. 1305), who acquired the fief of Duras by his marriage with a niece of Pope Clement V.
Gaillard I de Durfort (died 1356/7), son of preceding
Gaillard II de Durfort (died 1422), son of preceding, seneschal of Gascony
Gaillard III de Durfort (died 1452), son of preceding, seneschal of Landes
Gaillard IV de Durfort (died 1482)

17th century 

The greatness of the family dates, however, from the 17th century.

Guy Aldonce (1605–1665), marquis de Duras and comte de Rozan, had, by his wife Elizabeth de la Tour d'Auvergne, sister of Marshal Turenne, six sons, three of whom played a distinguished part.
Jacques Henri, the eldest son (1625–1704), was governor of Franche-Comté in 1674 and was created a marshal of France for his share in the conquest of that province (1675).
Guy Aldonce, the second son (1630–1702), comte de Lorges and duc de Quintin (known as the duc de Lorges), became a marshal of France in 1676, commanded the army in Germany from 1690 to 1695, and captured Heidelberg in 1693.
Louis, the sixth son (1640–1709), became Earl of Feversham under James II of England.

18th century 

Jean Baptiste (1684–1770), duc de Duras, son of Jacques Henri, was also a marshal of France. In 1733 he resigned the dukedom of Duras to his son, Emmanuel Felicité, himself receiving the brevet title of duc de Durfort.
Guy Michel de Durfort (1704–1773), duc de Lorges and Randan, marshal of France.
Emmanuel Felicité (1715–1789), duc de Duras, took part in all the wars of Louis XV and was made a marshal of France in 1775.
His grandson, Amedée Bretagne Maio (1771–1838), duc de Duras, is mainly known as the husband of Claire Louise Rose Bonne de Coetnempren de Kersaint (1778–1828), daughter of Armand Guy Simon de Coetnempren Kersaint, who, as duchesse de Duras, presided over a once celebrated salon and wrote several novels once widely read.

Durfort-Civrac 

The family of Durfort was later represented in France by the branch of Durfort-Civrac, dating from the 16th century.

Jean Laurent (1746–1826), marquis de Civrac, married his cousin, the daughter of the duc de Lorges; his son,
Guy Emeric Anne (1767–1837), duc de Civrac, became afterwards duc de Lorges.
Henri, marquis de Durfort-Civrac (1812–1884), was a well-known politician, and was several times elected vice-president of the Chamber of Deputies.

References

French noble families
English families
Marshals of France